Najafabad (also Romanized as Najafābād) is a village in Shahrestaneh Rural District, Now Khandan District, Dargaz County, Razavi Khorasan Province, Iran. At the 2006 census, its population was 27, in 7 families.

References 

Populated places in Dargaz County